Setesdal Vesthei Ryfylkeheiane is a protected area in Norway.

External links 
 Setesdal Vesthei - Ryfylkeheiane The board of Norwegian national parks 

Nature reserves in Norway
Setesdal